The Victorian Plantations Corporation (VPC) of Victoria, Australia, was established under the State Owned Enterprises Act in May 1993, and by June 1993 was declared a State Business Corporation.

The Corporation's functions and powers for the management of softwood and hardwood plantations were previously owned by the Victorian Government, and managed through the Forests Commission Victoria. The objective for establishing the Victorian Plantations Corporation was to create a statutory body to manage timber plantations:

to establish, maintain and manage timber plantations on land vested in or managed by the Corporation,
to enter into, administer or manage agreements or licences relating to forest produce on land vested in or managed by the Corporation.

The VPC was later sold in 1998 to American superannuation company Hancock Timber Resource Group for $550 million to become Hancock Victorian Plantations (HVP)

Victorian plantations history 
The Victorian Government through the Forests Commission Victoria (FCV) had been establishing forest plantations in many parts of the State over a period of almost 100 years.

Many species were trialled and, by around 1990, the majority of the plantation estate consisted of Pinus radiata, with a smaller area of native hardwoods – mostly Eucalyptus regnans in the Strzelecki ranges.

Initially, the goals were simply to rehabilitate land cleared during the goldrush, provide timber and avoid cost and unreliability of imported timber, generate revenue and create jobs through local sawmills. Commercial financial returns became a more important objective following increased investment with the plantations expansion program.

Planting was limited in the early years but accelerated from 1910, but unfortunately, large areas of the early plantings established in coastal areas between 1910 and 1930 failed due to the unsuitability of the sites. Activity picked up once again in the 1930s with unemployment relief schemes during the Great Depression. The war years saw activity again fall away sharply while after the war there was a new focus on developing native forests in eastern Victoria owing to the conclusion of the 1939 fire salvage and to provide timber for post-war housing construction. However, the Strzelecki reforestation program got underway in the 1940s with planting of both softwoods and hardwoods on abandoned farmland.

In 1949 the Commonwealth Forestry and Timber Bureau proposed a national planting program to make Australia more self-reliant in timber products after the shortages experienced during the war.

A new Ministerial Australian Forestry Council was formed in 1964 with one of its first decisions being to further raise the national softwood target, with the Commonwealth agreeing to provide loan monies to the States to plant 30,000 hectares of softwoods per year for 35 years.  Victoria took up the challenge by establishing and maintaining its plantations at nearly half the average cost of the other States.

Planting peaked in 1969 with a record 5,183 ha and by the end of 1982, the Forests Commission Victoria had established 87,000 hectares of softwood plantations, a five-fold increase since 1940. Softwood plantation zones were concentrated around Bright and Myrtleford in the Ovens Valley, Portland-Rennick, Latrobe Valley-Strzelecki Ranges, Ballarat-Creswick, Benalla-Mansfield, Upper Murray near Tallangatta-Koetong, the Otways and Central zone near Taggerty.

The estate had been traditionally managed by the FCV and had grown to become a major supplier of wood to industry as the plantations expanded and matured. This was done mostly on the basis of legislated, long-term wood supply contracts to ensure stable marketing and support of the industry.

Throughout the 1970s and '80s, political and social attitudes to commercial forestry changed significantly, and the new Cain State Labor Government which was elected in 1982 took a very different approach from past State Governments towards forestry, and indeed other Government owned assets.  Government Departments' were amalgamated and the management of State assets questioned at a number of levels.   Crown Land that had traditionally been used by Government for a range of services was sometimes viewed as “surplus” and sold to raise funds.  The State's (mostly) softwood plantations were also viewed as a potential for sale and so in 1990, a process of separation was begun.

Start of the separation - 1990 

In late 1990, the government was given advice that, if sold, the plantations could raise a significant amount of money – probably in the hundreds of millions. A number of models were evaluated and, in early 1991, CS First Boston was engaged to assess the sale possibility and identify the elements required. They concluded that a sale was possible, but that there were some significant impediments that would need to be overcome. These included but were not limited to, no commercial structure, non-assignable wood supply agreements, land tenure, employment and environmental issues, Federal loan issues etc.  They indicated a possible return of around $160 million and recommended a Competitive Tender/Negotiated sale from a number of other options which included Corporatisation as an initial step.

Other comprehensive legal advice was sought regarding contract issues etc., and the government decided not to sell at this stage, but to explore other options.  By early 1992 a number of the recognised impediments had been evaluated and possibilities including joint ventures, separation within the department and corporatisation were considered and a recommendation to Cabinet to corporatise was agreed in July 1992. This was virtually the last Kirner Labor Cabinet meeting prior to the state election and in September 1992 the new incoming Kennett Liberal Government, in accordance with their previously enunciated forest policy, directed that work commence immediately to have a separate Corporation in place by 30 June 1993. A project team was immediately established to work through many of the issues identified in the preceding 18 months. These included: valuation and finance, land and survey, management structures, workforce and industrial relations, legislation, fire protection and many other issues.  Each of these had interesting challenges and the major solutions included:

 Legislation – a new Act to establish the Victorian Plantations Corporation (VPC) was passed on the last sitting day of autumn 1993. The main purpose was to transfer land and other assets, and the wood supply agreements to the VPC.
 Land – the land was vested in the VPC with huge debates over boundaries.
 Communication and Working Parties – a statewide program was undertaken including all affected government staff.
 Management structures – in interim Board was established .
 Workforce and Industrial Relations – new legislation under the State Owned Enterprises Act helped, but there were major issues with Unions, superannuation, staff transfers etc.
 Research and Development – was contracted back to the Department of Conservation Forests and Lands (CFL)
 Fire Protection – Because of the land status, the CFL still had a legal responsibility, but this was done with VPC added capacity. This changed later with the Country Fire Authority CFA Industrial Brigades process.

Victorian Plantations Corporation - 1993 

The Victorian Plantations Corporation formally began as a State Owned Enterprise on 1 July 1993 with three staff (Managing Director, Deputy MD and Company Secretary) with all the management of the plantations undertaken by the Department of Conservation Forests and Lands on contract. The staffing process took until October when the Corporation took over full control and management of the estate of 106,250 ha of softwoods and 7,180 ha of hardwoods. This was a “top down” process where the Zone Managers (and other senior staff) were appointed first and they subsequently employed staff in their areas as required.

With a focus on managing only the plantation estate, the management structure was not constrained by previous historical links and accordingly the VPC structure was heavily field based with four separate geographical Zones identified and a central office based in Melbourne. Total staffing on plantations was cut from over 300 to 115 and the model for each Zone was tailored specifically to that area.  Staff were mostly employed on individual contracts although some of the field workforce chose to work under the Australian Workers' Union (AWU) award.  

Over the next five years, the VPC focused on optimising its resources and building a recognised, commercial organisation suitable for sale. The basic strategy was to develop maximum value from the inherited land base by:

 Bringing all unplanted land into production
 Replanting all harvested areas within 18 months
 Bringing unproductive but appropriate sites into production
 Disposing of sites with low production potential
 Develop new markets for its plantation products with strategic alliances with customers

In the first year of operation, VPC reported revenue in excess of $30 million with a net operating profit before tax of $12 million.  By June 1998 revenue had risen to $81 million and profit to $30.7 million. Over the same period the forest valuation went from $202 to $317 million, and $68 million was returned to the State Government in dividends.

Most of this commercial success was due to an increase in wood supply (from 1.15 to 1.96 million cubic metres), changing all wood supply agreements to commercial contracts and developing export markets not previously undertaken.  Careful control of costs through industry standard accounting systems and  prudent reserves for natural disasters and other contingencies were also implemented.

The inventory and yield regulation system (FRIYR), was inherited from the Department of Conservation Forests and Lands and was changed to standard plantation industry systems and fire protection was aligned with the Country Fire Authority (CFA) as Industry Brigades. The land boundaries were legally established and the survey project, which was carried out over 3 years, was the biggest since Federation and was mostly done remotely (for the first time) to produce Certified Plans.

Field operations were streamlined with many elements carried out on contract and mill door delivery of produce gradually increased over time, to 35% of total sales volume, adding to wood supply efficiencies.

In March 1998, the Government decided to proceed with privatising VPC and this process was completed in late 1998 when it was sold to the Hancock Timber Resource Group for $550 million to form Hancock Victorian Plantations (HVP).

Hancock Victorian Plantations - 1998 

The process that was begun in 1990 culminated in the sale of all the forest assets and harvesting rights, but not freehold title to the crown land estate, of the Victorian Plantations Corporation to Hancock Timber Resource Group in 1998.

Hancock Victorian Plantations (HVP) commenced operation in late 1998 and the only major change in the first 12 months was the replacement of the VPC Board with the new HVP Board.

The VPC had run on a very different model from the usual Hancock experience under pension fund ownership, and the “normal” Hancock model of a management company was not initiated. After the first year of operation, the Board initiated a restructure in late 1999 and there have been many “fine tuning” iterations since.

References

External links 

Hancock Victorian Plantations - https://www.hvp.com.au/

Victoria's Forestry Heritage (Tony Manderson) - https://www.victoriasforestryheritage.org.au

Forestry in Australia
Government agencies of Victoria (Australia)
Government-owned companies of Victoria (Australia)